Ngora District is a district in the Eastern Region of Uganda. The town of Ngora is the site of the district headquarters.

Location
Ngora District is bordered by Soroti District to the northwest, Katakwi District to the northeast, Kumi District to the east, Pallisa District to the south, and Serere District to the west. The coordinates of the district are:01 30N, 33 48E.

Overview
Ngora District was established on 1 July 2010 by the Ugandan parliament. Before that, it was part of the Kumi District. Ngora District together with Amuria District, Bukedea District, Kaberamaido District, Katakwi District, Kumi District, Serere District, and Soroti District comprise the Teso sub-region, home to an estimated 2.5 million people of Iteso and Kumam ethnicities. Jacqueline Amongin is the parliamentary Woman representative  for Ngora District. Ngora County is the only county in Ngora District represented by Abala David at parliament.

Population
In 1991, the national population census estimated the district population at 59,400. The 2002 national census estimated the population at 101,900. The annual population growth rate in the district has been calculated at 4.5 percent. It has been estimated that the population of Ngora District in 2012 was 157,400.

See also
Ngora Hospital
Districts of Uganda

References

External links
 About Ngora Freda Carr Hospital

 
Teso sub-region
Districts of Uganda
Eastern Region, Uganda